South Korea has one time zone, Korea Standard Time (UTC+09:00), which is abbreviated KST. South Korea currently does not observe daylight saving time, but experimented with it during the 1988 Summer Olympics in Seoul.

History
In 1434, inventor Jang Yeong-sil developed Korea's first automatic water clock, which King Sejong adapted as Korea's standard timekeeper. It is likely that Koreans used water clocks to keep time prior to this invention, but no concrete records of them exist. In 1437, Jang Yeong-sil, with Jeong Cho, created a bowl-shaped sundial called the angbu ilgu (Hangul: 앙부일구), which King Sejong had placed in public so anyone could use it.

Geographically, the western parts of Korea, including the South Korean capital city, Seoul, are UTC+08:00. In 1908, the Korean Empire adopted a standard time that was  hours ahead of GMT, UTC+08:30. In 1912, during the Japanese occupation of Korea, the Governor-General of Korea changed standard time to UTC+09:00 to align with Japan Standard Time. However, in 1954, the South Korean government under President Syngman Rhee reverted the standard time to UTC+08:30. Then in 1961, under the military government of President Park Chung-hee, the standard time was changed back to UTC+09:00 once again. 

In order to accommodate American television viewers, South Korea observed daylight saving time (UTC+10:00) when Seoul hosted the 1988 Summer Olympics. The one-hour time change meant that many daytime events could be broadcast live from South Korea when it was prime time on the U.S. east coast.

North Korea also uses Korea Standard Time. From August 2015 to May 2018, North Korea changed its time zone to UTC+08:30, a time zone known as Pyongyang Standard Time, but the change was reverted to promote Korean unity.

IANA time zone database
The IANA time zone database contains one zone for South Korea in the file zone.tab, named Asia/Seoul.

References

 
South Korea